Faerie Solitaire is a video game created and developed by independent video game developer and publisher Subsoap. The game was released 15 March 2009. This game mixes solitaire elements with fantasy and role-playing game elements.

Faerie Solitaire won The Wall Street Journal'''s Gamehouse "Most Addictive Game" in 2010.Faerie Solitaire Remastered'' was released on November 22, 2017.

References

2009 video games
Big Fish Games games
Linux games
MacOS games
Patience video games
Video games developed in the United States
Windows games